The banknotes of Zimbabwe were physical forms of Zimbabwe's first four incarnations of the dollar ($ or Z$), from 1980 to 2009. The banknotes of the first dollar replaced those of the Rhodesian dollar at par in 1981, one year after the proclamation of independence. The Reserve Bank of Zimbabwe issued most of the banknotes and other types of currency notes in its history, including the bearer cheques and special agro-cheques ("agro" being short for agricultural) that circulated between 15 September 2003 and 31 December 2008: the Standard Chartered Bank also issued their own emergency cheques from 2003 to 2004.

The obverse of Zimbabwean banknotes (including notes of the current dollar) featured an illustration of the Domboremari, one of the Chiremba Balancing Rocks located near Harare and Epworth: the Domboremari also appeared on bearer and agro-cheques, as part of the Reserve Bank's logo. The reverse often featured the culture or landmarks of the country.

The second dollar (ZWN) was replaced on 1 August 2008 by the third dollar (ZWR), which was then phased out by the fourth dollar (ZWL) with short notice on 2 February 2009 because it rapidly lost value. The economic and trade sanctions imposed against the Zimbabwean government and the Reserve Bank made it difficult to incorporate modern security features on most banknotes issued since September 2008.

The power-sharing government of Prime Minister Morgan Tsvangirai suspended the Zimbabwean dollar on 12 April 2009, and banknotes of the third and fourth dollars were demonetised in September 2015, after over 6 years of disuse. However, the Reserve Bank reintroduced local banknotes the following year, due to a shortage of hard currencies such as the United States dollar.

History 
The first banknotes of Zimbabwe were issued by the Reserve Bank of Zimbabwe (formerly Reserve Bank of Rhodesia) for the first dollar (ZWD) in 1980 to coincide with the independence of Zimbabwe. These notes replaced the circulating banknotes of the Rhodesian Dollar at par.

In May 2003, the Reserve Bank allowed the Cargill Cotton Group to issue emergency bearer cheques to cotton farmers, via a Standard Chartered Zimbabwe branch in Harare: Cargill issued these cheques due to a shortage of money caused by high annual inflation, which according to The Herald, was around 269.2% in June 2003.

These, and subsequent issues of the first and second dollars were time limited and lacked sophisticated anti-counterfeiting measures which were heavily used in many modern banknotes such as those of the Swiss Franc.

The time limits were either ignored or extended by multiple decrees, meaning that all notes of these issues remained legal tender in practice until 21 August 2006.

On 1 August 2006 the banknotes of the second dollar (ZWN), with less elaborate designs, replaced those of the first dollar at the ratio of 1 000 to 1. The redenomination (codenamed Operation Sunrise) was heavily publicised under the banner Zero to Hero, but was also rapid and disorganised which resulted in many people being unable to convert their old Bearer cheques to new issues before the lapse date, The Reserve Bank Governor Dr. Gideon Gono said that "10 trillion (first dollars) were still out there and it had become manure".

In the second quarter of 2008, special agro-cheques (agricultural cheques) were issued in denominations ranging from  billion to  billion as the currency exchange rate was floated. Since the functions were similar to Bearer cheques, it was in regular use as prices continue to rise. These cheques also carried time limits and limited security features. In the final months of the second dollar, the  cheque was the lowest legal tender denomination by decree, despite having its expiry date extended twice. The  000 Bearer Cheque would have been the lowest legal tender denomination in circulation had the expiry dates of currency cheques been enforced without extension, with the  billion agro-cheque being the highest whether or not the  note was legal tender.

Munich-based security printers Giesecke & Devrient ceased providing banknote paper to the Reserve Bank on 1 July 2008 in response to an official request from the German government and widespread calls for sanctions; The Jura JSP software end-user licence, issued to the state-owned Fidelity Printers & Refiners was also terminated on 24 July 2008 for similar reasons although the official press statement quoted that it was de facto impossible to prevent the printers from using the software.

On 1 August 2008 the banknotes of the third dollar (ZWR), which were printed for the abandoned second phase of the 2006 redenomination, replaced the cheques of the second dollar at the ratio of 10 billion (1010) to 1. The bearer and agro-cheques of the second dollar were phased out along with the smaller denominations of the third dollar on 1 January 2009. Despite the reform, the Reserve Bank issued several high-value denominations up to  trillion ($1014) in the period between September 2008 to January 2009, which merely kept in similar pace with the cash rate instead of the black market rates.

On 2 February 2009, banknotes of the fourth dollar (ZWL) were introduced to replace those of the third dollar at the ratio of one trillion (1012) to 1. It was originally envisaged that banknotes of the third dollar would remain legal tender until 30 June 2009 but all banknotes were withdrawn from circulation following the suspension of the Zimbabwe dollar on 12 April 2009.

Banknotes of the first dollar (ZWD)

The obverse of the first two series of banknotes featured a dominant motif of the Domboremari, surrounded by trees: the notes also featured major landmarks and landscapes on either side, such as the Kariba Dam and fauna. When high inflation escalated into hyperinflation at the end of the 20th century, the quality of the notes deteriorated as printing plates from previous issues were reconstituted for printing emergency notes. Although hyperinflation forced regular banknotes ($2 to ) out of practical use, all banknotes and bearer cheques of the first dollar remained legal tender until the Reserve Bank demonetised them on 21 August 2006.

1980 banknote series

The Reserve Bank of Zimbabwe prepared the first series of banknotes for the newly-independent country in 1980, and released them into circulation in stages, from 15 April 1981 to 14 April 1982. The 1980 series consisted of four denominations: $2, $5, $10 and $20 – and made extensive use of the Guilloché technique, a security feature common on many banknotes from the 1980s. The watermark consisted of a profile view of the Zimbabwe Bird, but the final batches of $2 and $5 notes, both dated 1994, had a ¾ view of the bird with a longer neck. The colour scheme also changed from the Rhodesian notes: the $2 note changed from red to blue, $5 from brown to green, $10 from grey to red, and the $20 note that debuted with this series was navy blue.

Banknotes dated 1980 bore Salisbury as the name of Zimbabwe's capital, which renamed itself to Harare on 18 April 1982: $5, $10 and $20 notes dated 1982 and later bore the updated name, but early batches of $10 notes dated 1982 erroneously bore the capital's old name. There were no $2 notes dated 1982: those dated 1983 and later had the updated name of the capital. Notes dated 1980 and 1982 carried the signature of Desmond Krogh, the last governor of the Reserve Bank of Rhodesia, and governor of the Reserve Bank of Zimbabwe until 1983: notes dated 1983 had the signature of Kombo James Moyana (governor from 1983 to August 1993), and notes dated 1994 had the signature of Leonard Tsumba (August 1993 to 31 July 2003).

1994 banknote series

From 1994 to 1997, the Reserve Bank introduced the second series of Zimbabwe banknotes into circulation. Due to high inflation, which at the time peaked at 42.1% in 1992, the rollout began with two new denominations, $50 and $100. Other denominations followed in 1997, while the $2 note was replaced by a coin. Worsening high inflation, which reached 140.1% in 2002, caused the Reserve Bank to introduce the $500 note on 31 August 2001, and the  note on 1 October 2003.

The overall layout of the 1994 series was similar to the 1980 series, but the Domboremari moved to the left, and the animals moved to the other side, acting as a see-through register. The obverse also had a flower at centre, a solid element with a latent image of the letters "RBZ", and tactile marks for the visually impaired. The watermark of the Zimbabwe Bird had a long neck, while the security thread was demetalised with the letters "RBZ" and the denomination. The $500 and  note also had a holographic stripe, but the $500 note dropped the feature when the main colour changed from red to brown.

Almost all banknotes in the 1994 series had the signature of Leonard Tsumba: the signature of his successor, Gideon Gono, appeared on $500 notes dated 2004. Giesecke+Devrient also printed some of the  notes: the serial number prefixes were "WA" to "WM" for the G+D notes, and "WN" to "WU" for the Fidelity notes.

Cargill bearer cheques

In May 2003, the Reserve Bank allowed the Cargill Cotton Group to issue emergency bearer cheques to cotton farmers, via a Standard Chartered Zimbabwe branch in Harare: Cargill issued these cheques due to a shortage of money caused by high annual inflation, which according to The Herald, was around 269.2% in June 2003.

The Cargill bearer cheques had the same legal status as regular banknotes, and were valid for six months from the date of issue, making them the first Zimbabwean currency notes with an expiry date. Typocrafters (a Zimpapers subsiduary) printed these bearer cheques, which carried the signature of Cargill's finance director Priscilla Mutenbwa, and operations director Stephen Newton-Howes.

2003 bearer cheque series

The cheques also had an expiry date, and circulated until the demonetisation of the first dollar, on 21 August 2006.

The  and  cheques used a modified underprint on the obverse, and a single-colour view of Victoria Falls on the reverse. Cheques dated 15 September 2003 bear the signature of the acting governor Charles Chikaura, and the remainder bear the signature of Dr. Gideon Gono, who became governor on 1 December 2003.

Banknotes of the second dollar (ZWN)

The Zimbabwean dollar was first redenominated on 1 August 2006 under a currency reform campaign codenamed Operation Sunrise and involving the motto Zero to Hero. New-style bearer cheques of the second dollar (ISO 4217:ZWN) was introduced and replaced those of the first dollar (ZWD) at the ratio of 1 000 to 1.

The change over process was given at short notice and was also rapid because all issues prior to the August 2006 series were to be demonetised and rendered worthless on 21 August 2006. Poor communications meant that many civilians of Zimbabwe were unable to convert old bearer cheques to new ones before the deadline.

2006, 2007 and 2008 Bearer cheque series

The  denomination was also issued, despite not being widely publicised in the changeover campaign.

Cheques with the denomination expressed as '10000' or '100000' bear serial numbers with the (scarce) prefix AA, while notes with prefixes AB onwards is expressed as '' or ''.

The  bearer cheque had its date of lapse extended twice up to 31 December 2008.

The  denomination was the first denomination to use the Optically Variable Ink technique, on the value positioned at the top right of the obverse. The  denomination of the December 2007 series was the only note out of all cheques of the second dollar to bear a holographic strip, as the cheque was printed on paper that was prepared for the 1 000 ZWD notes (Pick No. 12).

Three denominations of the 2008 series remained legal tender at the ratio of 1010 to 1 until being demonetised on 31 December 2008.

There are two variants of the  denomination, the primary difference being the typeface and size of the serial number. Those with slightly larger serial numbers bear the prefix DA. The  banknote is larger in dimension out of the rest of the 2008 series.

Special agro-cheques

The Reserve Bank circulated special agro-cheques ("agro" being an abbreviation of "agricultural"), from 15 May to 31 July 2008. They had a different design, and they were intended for use only by farmers: however, Zimbabweans treated them as regular money, because of the continued hyperinflation, and their similar function to bearer cheques. The Reserve Bank demonetised both agro- and bearer cheques on 31 December 2009, following the introduction of the third dollar.

The four denominations in this series are not the same by dimensions as the  note used different paper from the 500 ZWD banknote of 2001.

Banknotes of the third dollar (ZWR)

2007 banknote issues 

The 2007 banknote series was prepared by the Reserve Bank in October 2006 for the abandoned second phase of Operation Sunrise. The banknotes featured the Domboremari on the obverse, two scenes on the reverse, and the Zimbabwe Bird as the watermark. There were additional security features as opposed to previous issues, which included security threads, see-through register marks and recognition marks for the partially sighted. When the redenomination of 1 August 2008 occurred these notes were put into circulation as banknotes of the third dollar between 1 August 2008 to 31 December 2008.

2008 banknote issues 

The 2008 banknote series circulated from 29 September 2008 to 12 April 2009. These were followed by the following denominations:

  (13 October 2008)
 ,  and  million (3 November 2008)
  million,  million and  million (4 December 2008)
  million and  million (12 December 2008)
  billion,  billion and  billion notes (19 December 2008)
  billion and  billion notes (12 January 2009)
  trillion,  trillion,  trillion and  trillion (16 January 2009)

The large number of denominations issued in late-2008 as well as the suspension of paper supply by Giesecke & Devrient affected the Reserve Bank's ability to maintain the quality of the banknotes. Later denominations copied design features from the original 2007 banknote series and lacked many modern security features that banknotes of major currencies (such as the Canadian Dollar) relied on. A silhouette of the Zimbabwe Bird in Optically Variable Ink was used in such notes to compensate for this, but the iridescent strip was dropped for higher denominations. The  and  notes reused paper for the  notes (Pick no. 71), thereby carrying the embedded holographic thread and watermark.

Banknotes of the fourth dollar (ZWL)

On 2 February 2009, the Reserve Bank introduced banknotes of the fourth dollar, equal to one trillion ( or ) third dollars: the banknotes of the third dollar were supposed to lose legal tender status by 1 July 2009, but the power-sharing government of Prime Minister Morgan Tsvangirai instead suspended the Zimbabwean dollar entirely on 12 April 2009. The banknotes, along with those of the third dollar, were eventually demonetised on 30 September 2015, after 6 years and 171 days of disuse.

The banknotes of the fourth dollar consisted of seven denominations from $1 to $500, reusing elements from earlier issues. Security features were similar to the emergency issues of the third dollar, which replaced the watermark and the windowed security thread with an iridescent strip and the Zimbabwe Bird in optically variable ink: a series of triangles on the right edge acted as a registration device.

Zimbabwean Bond Notes (from 2016)

US$10 million worth of Zimbabwean Bond Notes were introduced in November 2016 and are denominated in U.S. dollars. They circulate along with eight other currencies, but could not be used outside of Zimbabwe. Withdrawals from Zimbabwean bank accounts were issued in Bond Notes. On 20 February 2019, during the Monetary Policy Statement, the Governor Dr Mangundya announced that physical bond notes, RTGS, Ecocash or OneWallet balances would all now be known as "RTGS dollars". These bear the signature of John Mangudya, the Governor of the Reserve Bank of Zimbabwe.

2019 and 2020 issues

The  entered circulation on 19 May, and the  entered circulation in the first week of June.

On 6 July 2021 the  entered circulation.

On 5 April 2022 the  entered circulation.

Replacement banknotes

The Reserve Bank allocated special prefixes for replacement banknotes: prefixes for replacement Zimbabwean dollar banknotes varied until the introduction of the second dollar in August 2006, when it largely settled on "ZA".

As collectibles

Hyperinflationary Zimbabwean banknotes (such as the  trillion denomination) have gained considerable interest from the numismatic community and buyers in general for their absurdity rather than for their designs. Some examples of such notes sold in 2008 for more than their true face value at the time. In 2011, House Budget Committee Chairman Paul Ryan and Stanford University economist John B. Taylor were said to keep  notes in their wallets as a physical reminder of the perils of hyperinflation.

The price and value of a Zimbabwean banknote depend on various factors: the rarity, based on factors such as the name of capital city, how long it was printed, or the type of watermark; its condition, and the national situation at the time of issue, such as shortages or hyperinflation. Zimbabwean banknotes are usually sold by banknote dealers over the counter or on the internet, although the most valued types theoretically qualify for inclusion in auction.

Similar to the Iraqi dinar scam, some promoters are claiming that a future "revalue" (RV) event will cause Zimbabwe dollar notes to regain some nonzero fraction of their original value.

Other circulating banknotes

As in every fiscal emergency, hard currency, particularly the United States dollar, has long served as a parallel currency on the black market, and many prices in shops would be posted in US dollars, even during periods when it was illegal to possess foreign currency or to transact business in US dollars.

A unique form of circulating specie is the fuel ration coupon, which has been issued in 2005, 2006, 2007 and 2008. Known denominations include 1, 5, 10, 20, 25, & 50 litres of petrol (gasoline), kerosene and/or diesel, and translate roughly into the local petrol price (about 1 UK pound sterling per litre or US$1.50 in late 2008). Businesses, including Western Union, have been reported paying employees with these coupons, and even auctions have been transacted in this currency. As with much Zimbabwe currency, printing standards are crude and counterfeiting is rampant; the RBZ has been dissuading this widespread use.

See also

 Reserve Bank of Zimbabwe
 Zimbabwean dollar
 Hyperinflation in Zimbabwe
 Economy of Zimbabwe
 Mosi-oa-Tunya (coin)

Notes

Footnotes

References

External links 

 Gallery of Zimbabwean Banknotes

Currencies of Zimbabwe
Zimbabwe
Zimbabwe